The 1967 New South Wales Rugby Football League premiership was the 60th season of Sydney's professional rugby league football competition, Australia's first. The introduction of the Cronulla-Sutherland and Penrith clubs saw a total of twelve teams from across the Sydney area compete for the J.J. Giltinan Shield and WD & HO Wills Cup during the season, which culminated in a grand final between South Sydney and Canterbury-Bankstown. This was also the first live televised broadcast of a football grand final of any code in Australia.

Season summary
The 1967 season was the first played under the limited tackle rule, replacing the previous era (since the code's 1908 inception) of unlimited tackles. The number of tackles was four and would remain at that number for only four years before being increased to six in 1971.

Also this season Lidcombe Oval became the Western Suburbs club's homeground.

The twelve sides met each other twice in twenty-two regular premiership rounds before the top four teams battled out four finals. For the sixth consecutive season St. George finished as minor premiers. The two newcomers to the premiership, Penrith and Cronulla-Sutherland, finished the season second last and last respectively.

In 1967 the Nine Network reached agreement with the NSWRFL for a fee of $5,000 for TV broadcasting rights for the grand final.

South Sydney won their seventeenth premiership, defeating Canterbury-Bankstown in their first grand final since 1947. This finally spelled the end for St. George's monopoly on Grand Final wins which lasted over a decade, and commenced a new period of Souths' dominance, in which they would win four premierships in a five-year period.

The 1967 season also saw the retirement from the League of future Australian Rugby League Hall of Fame inductee, Reg Gasnier.

Teams
1967 saw the NSWRFL expand to twelve teams with the introduction of the Penrith and Cronulla-Sutherland clubs. This was the first time the number of clubs had increased since 1947 and the first time ever the number of clubs competing totalled more than ten.

Ladder

Finals

Grand Final

Live television broadcast coverage of grand finals commenced in 1967 with the match being shown on all four Sydney channels. As a result, the crowd of 56,358 was the lowest seen at a grand final since the rainy 1962 St George and Wests decider.

South Sydney, led by new skipper John Sattler, began their period of dominance by downing Canterbury in a torrid 80 minutes played in bleak conditions with a light rain throughout. Taylforth and Eric Simms opened accounts with early goals, before John O'Neill barged over for a close-range try from dummy half. Canterbury's Ron Raper responded with a field-goal kicked from halfway and then Taylforth punished Souths with two successful penalty goals after firstly a clash between Kevin Ryan and O'Neill and then a scrum infringement. Canterbury led 8–5.

A turning point came just before half-time when Rabbitohs second rower Bob McCarthy swooped on a lofted pass from Canterbury's Col Brown intended for Johnny Greaves and ran the length of the field to take Souths into the break with a 10–8 lead.

Taylforth kicked his fourth goal to take the scores level nine minutes into the second-half but from that point on the match became a tight arm wrestle. With five minutes remaining Canterbury's Ross Kidd was penalised for a scrum feed and Simms kicked the Rabbitohs to a two-point lead which they held to give them their 17th premiership title.

It marked the beginning of a new golden period for Souths and Ron Coote, Mike Cleary, Bob McCarthy, O'Neill, Sattler and Simms would win four premierships in the next five seasons and figure prominently in representative squads of that period.

 South Sydney 12 (Tries: O,Neill, McCarthy. Goals: Simms 3)

 Canterbury-Bankstown 10 (Goals: Taylforth 4. Fld Goal: Raper)

Player statistics
The following statistics are as of the conclusion of Round 22.

Top 5 point scorers

Top 5 try scorers

Top 5 goal scorers

References

External links
 Rugby League Tables - Season 1967 The World of Rugby League
 Big League, News Magazines for the National Rugby League 13 June 2006
Results:1961-70 at rabbitohs.com.au
1967 J J Giltinan Shield and WD & HO Wills Cup at rleague.com
NSWRFL season 1967

New South Wales Rugby League premiership
NSWRFL season